The Union of Communist Students (UEC) is a French student political organization, part of the Mouvement Jeunes Communistes de France (MJCF, Young Communists Movement of France). It was founded in 1939 but dissolved after World War II. The UEC was re-created in 1956, along with the MJCF. It is independent from the French Communist Party (PCF) although it remains close to it. It maintains exchange contacts with the PCF, in particular on student issues. The UEC is organized in sectors, by university, and is led by a national collective elected during the congress of the MJCF and renewed during the National Assemblies of the facilitators, every year. A national coordination runs the organization.

Roots 

Although founded in 1939, the UEC is the heir of numerous students' associations, some of them created at the end of the 19th century at the beginning of the Third Republic. However, the Communist student movement was created following the 1920 Tours Congress of the French Section of the Workers' International (SFIO), in parallel with the creation of the Communist Youth and of the PCF (named at first SFIC - French Section of the Communist International).

During the July 12, 1920 Congress of the Etudiants socialistes révolutionnaires group (Revolutionary Socialist Students), mostly composed of anarchists (and not exclusively students), the Revolutionary Socialist Students decided to associate them with the Third International — four months before the creation of the Communist Youth and five months before the creation of the SFIC (future PCF). A lot of the Revolutionary Socialist Students were themselves former members of the mostly anarchist association Étudiants socialistes révolutionnaires internationalistes (Internationalist Revolutionary Socialist Students). After this decision, the Revolutionary Socialist Students took the name of Étudiants collectivistes révolutionnaires (Revolutionary Collectivist Students), among which were Nguyễn Sinh Cung, later known under the name of Hô Chi Minh.

After the creation of the Communist Youth (JC) and then of the Communist Youth International, the CYI absorbed the Internationale des Etudiants Socialistes and called forth to the communist students to join it. However, students' were not the priority of the JC — in 1920, France counted only 50,000 students, whom a vast majority came from the bourgeoisie. University circles were adamantly opposed to Communists, and mostly to the right — a lot of them were members of the monarchist Action française (AF). Until the 1930s, Communist presence in estudiantine sectors remained small, and the function of responsible of students quickly disappeared in the JC.

The majority of communist students gathered in the 1920s in the Union fédérale des étudiants (UFE, Federal Union of Students). Danielle and Laurent Casanova were both leaders in this union. The UFE, which boasted several thousand members, counted however many non-Communist members. Furthermore, it was confronted with problems regarding its political orientation, because of its mixed nature between a political association and a students' union. In 1935, after the February 6, 1934 riots organized by far-right leagues, the Etudiants socialistes (Socialist Students) merged with it. Despite this association, or the Clarté universitaire group of Georges Cogniot, related to Paul Vaillant-Couturier and Henri Barbusse's Clarté movement, there was no stable Communist youth organisation before 1938.

In December 1934, the Students' World Congress Against War and Fascism was organized in Brussels, a year after the World Youth Congress in Paris. Furthermore, the JC set up again, in 1935, a function of students' responsible, given to Aimé Albert. The office was renamed "Secretary for Students" at the JC Congress in Marseille of 1936. In 1937, during the Popular Front, the different communist students' groups organized themselves through the creation of a "national secretary of communist students of France," and published their first newspaper, Relève.

Foundation and history 

On April 1 and 2, 1939, the Union of Communist Students held its first, constitutive, national congress. It then boasted 1,000 members and groups in all of France, in particular in Paris, Toulouse, Grenoble and Strasbourg (where the local section was headed by Maurice Kriegel-Valrimont). Their main struggle was then anti-fascism, carried out in a difficult context because of the Munich Agreement. The UEC then gathered mainly university students, but also high school students. At the beginning of the war, the UEC became the UELC (Union des étudiants et lycéens communistes, Union of Communist Students and Lycéens - lycéens being high school students). The Congrès des lycéens anti-fascistes (Congress of Antifascist Lycéens) merged into it.

Dissolved after the Liberation, the UEC was re-created during the Fourth Republic, in 1956. Ten years later, "leftist" elements were excluded: those included Trotskyists who rejected Stalinism, such as Alain Krivine, future leader of the Trotskyist Revolutionary Communist League, and Maoists. The first created the Jeunesse communiste révolutionnaire (JCR, Revolutionary Communist Youth) and the second the Union des jeunesses communistes marxistes-léninistes (UJC (ml); Union of Marxist–Leninist Communist Youth).

Organisation 

Today, the UEC is organized in local sections, mostly  corresponding to universities or campus. These sections are sometimes regrouped in citywide sections or groups of cities. It is headed by a national collective of 30 members, elected during each congress of the MJCF. The national collective then elects a national coordination, charged of the implementation of the collective's decision and of the organisation of debates, as well as a national secretary.

The UEC is present in many universities, including the Sorbonne, Jussieu University, Tolbiac University, University of Paris III (Censier), Université de Versailles Saint-Quentin-en-Yvelines, University of Paris VIII, University of Aix-Marseille, University of Bordeaux, University of Caen, University of Grenoble, University of Lyon, University of Orléans, University of Dijon, etc.

Activity 

Along with ATTAC Campus, the UEC is the only student political association present at the national scale (notwithstanding students' union such as the UNEF). Since it is not a students' union, it does not present itself at students' elections in universities. However, the UEC did present an electoral list in December 2005 for the elections in the University of Aix-Marseille I, which obtained 15% of the votes; the vice-president of the students' representatives in the universities is therefore affiliated to the UEC.

The UEC contributes to political debate, carries out investigations and information tasks. It took part to the 2006 protests against the CPE labour contract. It has opposed itself to the Bologna process reforming universities at the European scale, implemented in France by the LMD reforms, and participated to the demonstrations in 2003 against these reforms. In June 2006, the UEC participated to the collective Unis contre l'immigration jetable (United Against Throw-Away Immigration) and to the creation of the Réseau université sans frontière (Network of Universities Without Borders), opposed to anti-immigration policies then enacted by Dominique de Villepin's government (with Nicolas Sarkozy as Minister of Interior).

List of national secretaries

Some former members 
Tony Bloncourt (executed in 1942)
Pierre Goldman (assassinated in 1979)
Maurice Kriegel-Valrimont (Resistant during Vichy France, died in 2006)
Alain Krivine (now leader of the Revolutionary Communist League, LCR)
Dominique Strauss-Kahn (president of the International Monetary Fund as of 2007)

References

Bibliography 
 BRILLANT, Bernard, Les clercs de 68. Paris : PUF, 2003.
 DREYFUS, Michel, PCF, crises et dissidences. Paris : éditions Complexe, 1990.
 HAMON Hervé, ROTMAN Patrick, Génération. 1. Les années de rêve. Paris : Le Seuil, 1987. 
 MATONTI, Frédérique, Intellectuels communistes, essai sur l'obéissance politique : la Nouvelle Critique (1967-1980). Paris : la Découverte, 2005.
 Mouvement de la jeunesse communiste de France, Jeunesse, socialisme, liberté : congrès extraordinaire du mouvement de la jeunesse communiste de France, Paris : MJCF, 1977. 200 pages.
 ROBRIEUX, Philippe, Notre génération communiste (1953-1968). Paris : Robert Laffont, 1977.
 ROBRIEUX, Philippe, Histoire intérieure du Parti communiste français, quatre tomes. Paris :  Fayard, 1980-1984.
 RUSCIO, Alain, Nous et moi, grandeurs et servitudes communistes. Paris : éditions Tirésias, 2003.
 VARIN, Jacques, Jeunes comme JC : sur la jeunesse communiste (1920 - 1939). Paris : éditions sociales, 1975. 271 pages.

External links 
 UEC homepage

Student wings of communist parties
Student wings of political parties in France
French Communist Party
Student organizations established in 1939